Randee Joanne Hermus (born November 14, 1979) is a Canadian former professional soccer defender, who won the bronze medal with the Canadian women's national soccer team at the 2007 Pan American Games. Born in Surrey, British Columbia, she played for the Vancouver Whitecaps.

References

External links
 / Canada Soccer Hall of Fame
 
 
 
 

1979 births
Living people
Canadian women's soccer players
Canada women's international soccer players
Women's association football defenders
Soccer people from British Columbia
Simon Fraser University alumni
People from Surrey, British Columbia
Olympic soccer players of Canada
2003 FIFA Women's World Cup players
2007 FIFA Women's World Cup players
Footballers at the 2007 Pan American Games
Footballers at the 2008 Summer Olympics
FIFA Century Club
USL W-League (1995–2015) players
Vancouver Whitecaps FC (women) players
Toppserien players
Expatriate women's footballers in Norway
Pan American Games bronze medalists for Canada
Pan American Games medalists in football
Medalists at the 2007 Pan American Games